Parsonage–Turner syndrome, also known as acute brachial neuropathy, neuralgic amyotrophy and abbreviated PTS, is a syndrome of unknown cause; although many specific risk factors have been identified (such as; post-operative, post-infectious, post-traumatic or post-vaccination), the cause is still unknown. The condition manifests as a set of symptoms most likely resulting from autoimmune inflammation of unknown cause of the brachial plexus.

Parsonage–Turner syndrome occurs in about 1.6 out of 100,000 people every year.

Signs and symptoms
This syndrome can begin with severe shoulder or arm pain followed by weakness and numbness. Those with Parsonage–Turner experience acute, sudden-onset pain radiating from the shoulder to the upper arm. Affected muscles become weak and atrophied, and in advanced cases, paralyzed. Occasionally, there will be no pain and just paralysis, and sometimes just pain, not ending in paralysis.  MRI may assist in diagnosis. Scapular winging is commonly seen.

Mechanism
Parsonage-Turner involves neuropathy of the suprascapular nerve in 97% of cases, and variably involves the axillary and subscapular nerves. As such, the muscles usually involved are the supraspinatus and infraspinatus, which are both innervated by the suprascapular nerve. Involvement of the deltoid is more variable, as it is innervated by the axillary nerve.

Diagnosis

Diagnosis often takes three to nine months to be made, as the condition is often unrecognised by physicians.

Differential diagnosis
The differential focuses on distinguishing it from similar entities such as quadrilateral space syndrome, which involves the teres minor and variably the deltoid, and suprascapular nerve impingement at the spinoglenoid notch, which predominantly involves the infraspinatus.

Prognosis
Despite its wasting and at times long-lasting effects, most cases are resolved by the body's healing system, and recovery is usually good in 18–24 months, depending on how old the person in question is. For instance, a six-year-old could have brachial neuritis for only around six months, but a person in their early 50s could have it for more than three years.

It was traditionally thought that most people would regain around 70-90 per cent of their original strength and function levels, however most recent studies suggest that long-term complications are more common than previously thought.

Eponym
It is named after British neurologists Maurice Parsonage and John Turner, who described 136 cases in a 1948 Lancet publication. Other cases with similar symptom presentation had previously been published as early as 1897, but these publications were not as extensive as Parsonage and Turner's 1948 publication.

See also
Hereditary neuralgic amyotrophy

References

External links 

Syndromes
Diseases named for discoverer